Quillacollo is a province in the Cochabamba Department, Bolivia.
It is known for its festival in August where people from all over Bolivia come and pay homage to the Virgin of Urqupiña (Virgen de Urqupiña). Quillacollo is said to be one of the fastest-growing cities in Bolivia.

Geography 
Other mountains are listed below:

Subdivision 
The province is divided into five municipalities which are further subdivided into cantons.

Languages 
The languages spoken in the Quillacollo Province are mainly Spanish and Quechua. The following table shows the number of those belonging to the recognized group of speakers.

See also 
 Ch'aki Mayu
 Inka Raqay
 Sayt'u Qucha
 Tunari National Park

References 

Provinces of Cochabamba Department